= Anworth Mortgage Asset Corporation =

Real estate investment company in California

- Industry: Real estate investment trust
- Founded: October 20, 1997; 28 years ago
- Founder: Joseph Lloyd McAdams
- Defunct: March 19, 2021; 5 years ago
- Headquarters: Santa Monica, California
- Key people: Joseph E. McAdams, Chairman, CEO & President; Charles J. Siegel, CFO
- Revenue: ▼$154 million (2019)
- Net income: ▼ -$64 million (2019)
- Total assets: ▼$4.938 billion (2019)
- Total equity: ▼$552 million (2019)
- Website: www.anworth.com

Anworth Mortgage Asset Corporation was a mortgage real estate investment trust. In 2021, it was acquired by Ready Capital Corporation.

== History ==
The company was formed in October 1997. On March 17, 1998, the company commenced operations and became a public company via an initial public offering.

In August 2007, the company's subsidiary, Belvedere Trust Mortgage Corporation, received a notice of default.

In March 2021, the company was acquired by Ready Capital Corporation.
